Ministério da Educação (Ministry of Education) may refer to:
 Ministério da Educação (Brazil), the Brazilian education ministry.
 Ministério da Educação (Portugal), the Portuguese education ministry.